Intercollegiate Athletic Arena is an 8,000 seat multi-purpose arena in Providence, Rhode Island. It was built in 1995. It is the home of the Rhode Island College Anchormen basketball teams.

Indoor arenas in Rhode Island
College basketball venues in the United States
Sports venues in Rhode Island
Buildings and structures in Providence, Rhode Island
Sports venues in Providence County, Rhode Island
1995 establishments in Rhode Island
Sports venues completed in 1995